"I Get Along Without You Very Well" is a popular song composed by Hoagy Carmichael in 1939, with lyrics based on a poem written by Jane Brown Thompson, and the main melodic theme on the Fantaisie-Impromptu in C sharp minor, Op 66,
by Frédéric Chopin. Thompson's identity as the author of the poem was for many years unknown; she died the night before the song was introduced on radio by Dick Powell.

The biggest-selling version was a 1939 recording by Red Norvo and his orchestra (vocal by Terry Allen).

Carmichael and Jane Russell performed the song in the 1952 film noir The Las Vegas Story.

Notable recordings
Dick Todd and his orchestra (recorded February 8, 1939, released by Bluebird Records as catalog number 10150, with the flip side "I Promise You")
Charlie Barnet and his orchestra (recorded January 20, 1939, released by Bluebird Records as catalog number 10119A, with the flip side "I'm Prayin' Humble")
Chet Baker – Chet Baker Sings (recorded 1954, released 1956)
Frank Sinatra – In the Wee Small Hours (1955)
Karen Chandler – Her Dot single brought the song to #19 on Billboard's 1968 Easy Listening chart.
Larry Clinton and his orchestra (recorded January 20, 1939, released by Victor Records as catalog number 26151A, with the flip side "The Masquerade Is Over")
Dorothy Carless - Mixed Emotions (1956)
The Four Freshmen – Four Freshmen and Five Saxes (1957)
Sammy Davis Jr. - Mood to Be Wooed (1957) (with Mundell Lowe on guitar)
Billie Holiday – Lady in Satin (1958)
Evelyn Knight (released by Decca Records in the United States as catalog number 27992, with the flip side "The Purtiest Little Tree," and in 1953 by Brunswick Records (United Kingdom) as catalog number 05039, with the flip side "Lonesome and Blue")
Frankie Laine – Torchin' (1958)
Dirk Bogarde – Lyrics for lovers (1960)
Rosemary Clooney – Rosie Solves the Swingin' Riddle! (1960)
Peggy Lee – If You Go (1961)
Matt Monro – Matt Monro Sings Hoagy Carmichael (1962)
June Christy – The Intimate Miss Christy recorded April 1963 https://web.archive.org/web/20120218154042/http://www.belten.freeserve.co.uk/misty/junechri.doc
Petula Clark – In Other Words (1962)
Tony Mitchell (released 1957 by Liberty Records as catalog number 55110, with the flip side "Tell Me, Tell Me")
Red Norvo and his orchestra (vocal by Terry Allen; recorded February 8, 1939, released by Vocalion Records as catalog number 4648, with the flip side "Kiss Me with Your Eyes" and by Conqueror Records as catalog number 9177, with the flip side "Could Be")
Nina Simone – Nina Simone and Piano (1969)
The Durutti Column – I Get Along Without You Very Well/Prayer (Factory Records FAC 64, 1983)
Linda Ronstadt – For Sentimental Reasons (1986)
Dinah Shore (recorded October 1947, released by Columbia Records as catalog number 38201, with the flip side "I'll Be Seeing You" and as catalog number 38570, with the flip side "Little White Lies")
Nelson Riddle - Hey...Let Yourself Go! (1957)
Carly Simon – Torch (1981) - with an orchestral arrangement by Marty Paich. Record World said that Simon's "chilling vocal is the perfect vehicle for the strong lyrics, and Mike Mainieri's sensitive arrangement/production makes it a touching statement."
Renato Russo – The Stonewall Celebration Concert (1994)
Mel Tormé (1998)
Diana Krall – The Look of Love (Diana Krall album) (2001)
Tony Bennett - featuring on Bill Charlap's album "Stardust" (2002) 
Stacey Kent – The Boy Next Door (2003)
Jamie Cullum – The Pursuit (album) (2009)
Franck Amsallem – Amsallem Sings (2009)
Daniel Matto – I'm Old Fashioned (2010)
Molly Ringwald – Except Sometimes (2013)
Eliane Elias - I Thought About You (2013)
Sílvia Pérez Cruz – Granada (Sílvia Pérez Cruz album) (2014)
Marianne Faithfull – Give My Love to London (2014)
Kristin Chenoweth – The Art of Elegance (2016)
Dan Bodan (2019)
Chrissie Hynde - Valve Bone Woe (2019)

References 

Songs with music by Hoagy Carmichael
Frank Sinatra songs
Nina Simone songs
1939 songs
Torch songs
Bluebird Records singles
Chet Baker songs